Michael John Kelly (born 18 October 1942) is an English former professional footballer who played as a goalkeeper. He made 116 appearances in the Football League playing for Queens Park Rangers and Birmingham City. He went on to managerial positions, including nine months as manager of Plymouth Argyle, before concentrating on coaching.

Playing career
Born in Northampton, Kelly started his football career as a junior with Chelsea, but after two seasons (1959/60 and 1960/1), he was released and joined Wimbledon in the Isthmian League, as an amateur player. He was in the Wimbledon teams which beat Sutton United in the final of the FA Amateur Cup in 1963, won the championship of the Isthmian League in two consecutive seasons, and finished runners-up in the Southern League First Division. During this period he was capped three times for the England national amateur football team.

In 1966 he turned professional with Queens Park Rangers, spending four seasons with the club. He then moved on to Birmingham City, where he spent six years, followed by one season as player-coach of the Minnesota Kicks in the NASL, before returning to England to start a career in coaching.

Coaching career
On his return to England Kelly was appointed reserve team manager of Plymouth Argyle. When manager Tony Waiters resigned, Kelly took his place, himself resigning after nine months with the team seemingly heading for relegation. He went on to assistant manager roles at Fulham, Crystal Palace and West Bromwich Albion.

He was England goalkeeping coach from 1984 to 1990 and worked with the team in two World Cups, then performed a similar role with the Switzerland national football team until the 1994 World Cup. At club level he worked with many clubs in England and abroad, and in December 2007 he joined Fulham F.C. as goalkeeping coach and assistant manager under Roy Hodgson, with whom he had worked at club and national level. In 2010, he followed Hodgson to Liverpool. He left following Hodgson's departure.

References
General
 
 
 
Specific

External links

1942 births
Living people
Footballers from Northampton
English footballers
England amateur international footballers
Association football goalkeepers
Wimbledon F.C. players
Queens Park Rangers F.C. players
Birmingham City F.C. players
Minnesota Kicks players
English football managers
Plymouth Argyle F.C. managers
English Football League players
English Football League managers
North American Soccer League (1968–1984) players
Fulham F.C. non-playing staff
Liverpool F.C. non-playing staff
English expatriate sportspeople in the United States
Expatriate soccer players in the United States
English expatriate footballers